Eskişehir Caricature Museum is a museum in Eskişehir, Turkey
It is in a neighborhood of museums.

The building is a residence house built in 1900s. It was restored and used as a museum of Anadolu University. Each room of the house is dedicated to different displays such as, permanent display, temporary display, Eskişehir caricaturists’ display, portraits of famous caricaturists etc. There is also a library in the museum

Gallery

References

Museums in Eskişehir
Caricature
Odunpazarı
Anadolu University